The 1150 class were a class of diesel locomotive built by GE Transportation and A Goninan & Co for Queensland Railways between 1952 and 1956.

History
The 1150 class were the first mainline diesels purchased by Queensland Railways. Ten hooded locomotives built by GE Transportation, Erie, Pennsylvania, in 1952/53. They were initially numbered 1210–1219. In 1956 they were renumbered as the 1300 class. In 1956, an additional three were delivered by A Goninan & Co, Broadmeadow.

In 1962, 1306 became the first diesel locomotive in Queensland to log 1 million miles. In 1965, they were again renumbered as the 1150 class. They were initially used in the Darling Downs region to haul wheat, then on the North Coast line and the Western line. In the 1980s, the six remaining units were based at Townsville.

Withdrawal & disposal
The first unit was withdrawn in 1975 with the final six withdrawn in 1987.

Two units have been preserved:
1150 is being restored by the Australian Railway Historical Society Queensland Division at Townsville
1159 is retained by the Queensland Rail Heritage Division at North Ipswich

Fleet summary

References

Co-Co locomotives
Diesel locomotives of Queensland
General Electric locomotives
Queensland Rail locomotives
Railway locomotives introduced in 1952
Diesel-electric locomotives of Australia